The 17th Biathlon World Championships were held in 1979 in Ruhpolding, in the then West Germany.

Men's results

20 km individual

10 km sprint

4 × 7.5 km relay

Medal table

References

1979
Biathlon World Championships
International sports competitions hosted by West Germany
1979 in West German sport
February 1979 sports events in Europe
1979 in Bavaria
Biathlon competitions in West Germany
Sports competitions in Bavaria